The Pennsylvania Northeastern Railroad  is a short-line railroad operating on trackage mostly in Bucks and Montgomery counties to the north of Philadelphia, Pennsylvania. It was created in 2011, taking over former operations from CSX Transportation. The Pennsylvania Northeastern Railroad interchanges with CSX in Lansdale, the East Penn Railroad in Telford, and the New Hope Railroad in Warminster.

Operations

The lines operated by the Pennsylvania Northeastern Railroad include the Bethlehem Branch from Newtown Junction to Telford, the Doylestown Branch from Lansdale to Doylestown, the New Hope Branch from Glenside to Ivyland, the New York Line from Jenkintown to Neshaminy Falls, as well as a  portion of the Stony Creek Branch near Lansdale. The Pennsylvania Northeastern Railroad also operates the Lansdale Yard in Lansdale. The railroad interchanges with CSX Transportation in Lansdale and the New Hope Railroad in Warminster. The Pennsylvania Northeastern Railroad offers various freight rail services including transloading of bulk commodities between railcars and trucks, rail access to warehouse facilities including Lansdale Warehouse and AmeriCold Logistics LLC in Hatfield and storage of railcars.

History
In December 2010, it was announced that a newly formed shortline, the Pennsylvania Northeastern Railroad, would be taking over freight operations in the Lansdale area from CSX. Under the new arrangement, CSX would still move freight north from Philadelphia while the PN would serve customers in Lansdale, Hatfield, Souderton, Telford and Warminster. In addition, PN serves as a bridge route for rail traffic bound for the East Penn Railroad's Quakertown line, and the New Hope Railroad. The Pennsylvania Northeastern Railroad took over operations from CSX in August 2011.

Roster

Former Units

See also

Rail transportation in the United States
List of Pennsylvania railroads
New Hope Railroad

References

External links

Official website

Pennsylvania railroads
Railway companies established in 2011
Spin-offs of CSX Transportation